Ennistymon is a Gaelic Athletic Association club located in the town of Ennistymon, County Clare in Ireland. The club field teams in Gaelic Football and hurling competitions. Uniquely in Clare the club wears completely different colours in both codes - white and black for football, green and yellow for hurling. Their club crest also is shown in different colours although they each have a matching design.

Major honours
 Clare Senior Football Championship Runners-Up: 1889 (as Clouna), 1942, 2018, 2022
 Clare Intermediate Football Championship (2): 1991, 2005 
 Clare Junior A Hurling Championship (1): 2004
 Clare Junior A Football Championship (3): 1973, 1987, 2021
 Clare Under-21 A Football Championship (2): 2010, 2022

References

External links

Gaelic games clubs in County Clare
Hurling clubs in County Clare